Tarzan Ki Beti is an action adventure film of Bollywood directed by B. Pratap Singh and produced by Iqbal Singh Sehra. This movie was released in 2002 under the banner of Kusum Art International as a sequel of the Adventures of Tarzan. Hemant Birje portrayed Tarzan in both the films.

Plot 

Arjun loves an orphan girl Kiran. When they are about to be married. Kiran knows from her mother that her father is Tarzan. Kiran also has a sister, Aarti who still lives in the jungle. Some hunter tries to catch Arti in the jungle. A forest ranger helps Aarti to reunite with her family.

Cast 
 Hemant Birje as Renger/Tarzan
 Ritika Singh as Baby of Tarzan
 Raza Murad as Hunter
 Dhananjay Singh as Arjun
 Ali Khan
 Ray Avasthi
 Jatin Khan
 Prem Raz
 Komal Singh
 Madhu Sharma
 Vinod Phukari

Soundtrack

References

External links
 

2002 films
2000s action adventure films
2000s Hindi-language films
Indian action adventure films
Indian erotic films
Tarzan films